Christian Joseph Jagemann (1735, Dingelstädt – 5 February 1804, Weimar) was a German scholar, court-advisor and librarian.

Life
Against his parents' wishes Christian became a monk, entering the Augustinian monastery at Erfurt in 1752. However, he soon fled to Denmark, where he became a private tutor. He reconciled with his parents and returned home, but then had to go to Rome and Florence as a Catholic priest. After his homecoming he joined the court of the prince of Mainz in 1774 as director of a church gymnasium in Erfurt, but lost this position the following year on the prince's death. Converting to Protestantism, in 1775 he became advisor and librarian to duchess Anna Amelia in Weimar. By his written works he promoted knowledge of the Italian old masters to Germany. His successor as librarian was Carl Ludwig Fernow.

Children 
 Karoline Jagemann (1777-1848), actress and singer
 Ferdinand Jagemann (1780-1820), painter
 Marianne, wife of Adolph Freiherr von Danckelmann, 1806 to 1815

Works
 1775: Geographische Beschreibung des Großherzogtums Toskana, Gotha 
 1777: Geschichte der freien Künste und Wissenschaften in Italien, 5 vol, 1777-1781
 1780: Magazin der italienischen Literatur und Künste, 8 vol, 1780-1785
 1805: Italienisches Wörterbuch, 4 Bände, 1805

Translations
 "Die Hölle" from Dante's Göttliche Komödie 1780-1782 (available on www.dantealighieri.dk)
 Goethes "Hermann u. Dorothea." (e-text (Ermanno e Dorotea) on www.dantealighieri.dk),

External links

 ADB:Jagemann, Christian Joseph at: Allgemeine Deutsche Biographie.

1735 births
1804 deaths
People from Eichsfeld (district)
German librarians
German art historians
Augustinian friars
Converts to Protestantism
Roman Catholic friars
18th-century German Roman Catholic priests
German male non-fiction writers
Jagemann family